The Radio One Recordings is a compilation album of British musician Gary Numan tracks played live and recorded live for BBC Radio 1. The album brings together the tracks from the July 1989 EP of Tubeway Army's 10 January 1979 and Numan's 29 May 1979 sessions for disc jockey John Peel's show and three tracks broadcast by BBC Radio 1 from the Year of the Child concert held at Wembley Arena on 30 November 1979.

Track listing
All tracks written by Gary Numan.

"Me! I Disconnect From You" – 3:07
"Down in the Park" – 4:17
"I Nearly Married a Human" – 6:37
"Cars" – 3:15
"Airlane" – 3:24
"Films" – 2:47
"Conversation" – 6:45
"Me! I Disconnect From You" (live) – 3:06
"Metal" (live) – 3:28
"Down in the Park" (live) – 5:04

"Me! I Disconnect From You" is incorrectly listed as "Me, I Disconnect From You".

Personnel
Gary Numan – vocals, keyboards (tracks 1–3), guitar (tracks 1–3)
Rrussell Bell – guitar (tracks 8–10), keyboards (tracks 8–10), viola (tracks 8–10)
Neil Burn – engineer (tracks 1–3)
Billy Currie – keyboards (tracks 1–10)
Paul Gardiner – bass
Jeff Griffin – producer (tracks 8–10)
Jess Lidyard – drums (tracks 1–3)
Chris Lycett – engineer (tracks 8–10)
Chris Payne – keyboards (tracks 4–10)
Mike Robinson – engineer (tracks 4–7)
Bob Sargeant – producer (tracks 1–3)
Cedric Sharpley – drums (tracks 4–10)
Tony Wilson – producer (tracks 4–7)

References

1999 compilation albums
Gary Numan compilation albums
Gary Numan live albums
1999 live albums
BBC Radio recordings
Albums produced by Bob Sargeant